Markus W. Ribbe is an American microbiologist and biochemist, focusing in chemical biology and inorganic and organometallic, currently at University of California, Irvine, also holding the Chancellor's Professorship, and an Elected Fellow of the American Association for the Advancement of Science and American Academy of Microbiology.

References

Year of birth missing (living people)
Living people
Fellows of the American Association for the Advancement of Science
University of California, Irvine faculty
21st-century American chemists